Martha Schwartz (born November 21, 1950) is an American landscape architect and educator. Schwartz is the founding principal of Martha Schwartz Partners, an architecture firm based in London, New York City, and Shanghai. She is also Professor in Practice of Landscape Architecture at the Harvard University Graduate School of Design.

Career
A native of Philadelphia, Schwartz received a Bachelor of Fine Arts degree from the Penny W. Stamps School of Art & Design at the University of Michigan in 1973. After two years of graduate studies at Michigan, she transferred to the Graduate School of Design at Harvard University. During a summer internship at SWA Group, Schwartz advanced her interest in landscape architecture. Her career was launched in 1979 by her first project, The Bagel Garden, in Boston.

In 1980, Schwartz began her own architecture firm, Martha Schwartz Partners, which would allow her to flip the traditional ideals in the field of landscape architecture, and further investigate the connections between the arts, culture, and landscape. Since 2007, she has been Professor in Practice of Landscape Architecture and Faculty Associate of the Center for the Environment at Harvard University. She was also a resident of the American Academy in Rome in 1993.

Personal life
In 1979, Schwartz married noted landscape architect Peter Walker, and divorced in 2000. They had two sons: Jacob, who is founder of Ballistic Architecture Machine, an architecture firm in Beijing; and Joseph, who is known for his performances with StarKid Productions.

Notable works

Grand Canal Square Plaza, Bord Gáis Energy Theatre, Dublin, Ireland (2008)
Rio Shopping Center, Atlanta, GA, United States (1988)
Plaza, King County Courthouse, Seattle, United States (1987)
Splice Garden, Whitehead Institute, Cambridge, United States (1986)
Bagel Garden, Boston, United States (1979).

References

External links
Martha Schwartz Partners website
Harvard GSD profile

1950 births
Living people
American landscape architects
Women landscape architects
Architects from Philadelphia
Penny W. Stamps School of Art & Design alumni
Harvard Graduate School of Design alumni